Wangpha Lowang is an Indian politician. He was elected to the Lok Sabha, the lower house of the Parliament of India from the Arunachal East constituency of Arunachal Pradesh  as a member of the Indian National Congress.

Birth and Family
Belonging to the Nocte tribe, Wangpha Humchha Lowang was born in 1937 at Hakhunthin, the first settlement of the present-day Namsang village of Tirap district. His father Wangwai H. Lowang was a farmer, and his mother Chalon Bangsia was a housewife. His grandfather Kemwang was a head-hunter and a front leader in many tribal feuds.

When he was a child, Lowang had lost four siblings to diseases. He is survived by four brothers, namely Wangmok, Khenwang and Nanne. Wangmok is a retired pharmacist and the first Nocte person to pursue this field. Khenwang is a local politician and Nanne is a senior government advocate and also the first Nocte person to become an advocate.

Education

In 1948, Wangpha H. Lowang started his education from the government school built at his village Namsang. He completed his middle school in 1956 from Demonstration School located at Margherita, Assam. For higher school education, he went to Pasighat Government Higher Secondary School and passed the matric exam in 1961.

In 1962, Wangpha H. Lowang enrolled in St. Edmund's College, Shillong for Pre-University Course. However, he was diagnosed with tuberculosis and could not rejoin for the next four years. In 1966, he enrolled in St. Anthony's College, Shillong, and passed out with a degree in arts in 1969. During his college studies, Lowang had also worked in the erstwhile Northeast Frontier Agency (N.E.F.A.) Secretariat (Shillong) in the capacity of a Lower Divisional Clerk. He is the first graduate Nocte person.

References

External links
 Official Biographical Sketch in Lok Sabha Website

1945 births
Indian National Congress politicians
Lok Sabha members from Arunachal Pradesh
India MPs 1984–1989
Living people
People from Tirap district
Naga people